Pentace microlepidota is a species of flowering plant in the family Malvaceae. It is a tree endemic to Peninsular Malaysia.

References

microlepidota
Endemic flora of Peninsular Malaysia
Trees of Peninsular Malaysia
Vulnerable plants
Taxonomy articles created by Polbot